The term Tsinghua clique refers to a group of Chinese Communist Party (CCP) politicians that have graduated or have taught at Tsinghua University. They are members of the fourth generation of Chinese leadership, and are purported to hold powerful reformist ideas (a number have studied in the United States following graduation from Tsinghua, and some are said to be influenced by the reform ideals of Hu Yaobang). Just like their predecessors, they attach great importance to socialism with Chinese characteristics. Their ascendance to power is likely to have begun in 2008 at the CCP's 17th National Congress.

Many Tsinghua graduates rise to political prominence. Among the 7 standing committees at the Politburo, there is one Tsinghua graduate; among the 25 Politburo committee members, there are three.

Key figures are reported to currently include:
Xi Jinping
Wang Qishan
Chen Xi
Li Xi
Hu Heping
Chen Jining
Zhang Guoqing
Yang Yue

Retired or deceased:
Zhang Dongsun
Zhang Junmai
Luo Longji
Fei Xiaotong
Pan Guangdan
Qian Weichang
Peng Peiyun
Kang Shien
Wu Guanzheng
Hu Qili
Huang Ju
Yao Yilin
Song Ping
Li Ximing
Wang Hanbin
Zhou Guangzhao
Zheng Tianxiang
Zhu Rongji
Hu Jintao
Wu Bangguo, although he is generally considered more loyal to Jiang Zemin's Shanghai clique
Lin Wenyi, chairman of the Taiwan Democratic Self-Government League
Liu Yandong

The Tsinghua clique also referred to a group of Nationalist Chinese politicians who held high power in the Republic of China government and fled to Taiwan with the government during the Chinese Civil War. All of them are deceased:
Yeh Kung-chao
Yu Guohua
Yen Zhenxing
Mei Yi-chi
Luo Jialun
Hu Shih
Sun Li-jen

See also 
 Shanghai clique
 Generations of Chinese leadership
 Tuanpai

References

"The rise of Qinghua alumni in Beijing's political circle", by Ting Wang, Hong Kong Economic Journal, 29 December 2005

Factions of the Chinese Communist Party
Qinghua clique
Tsinghua University alumni